Bolandiol dipropionate (USAN) (brand names Anabiol, Storinal; former developmental code name SC-7525), or bolandiol propionate (JAN), also known as norpropandrolate or 19-nor-4-androstenediol dipropionate, as well as estr-4-ene-3β,17β-diol 3,17-dipropionate, is a synthetic anabolic-androgenic steroid (AAS) and derivative of 19-nortestosterone (nandrolone). It is an androgen ester – specifically, the 3,17-dipropionate ester of bolandiol (19-nor-4-androstenediol).

See also
 Androstenediol dipropionate
 Testosterone acetate butyrate
 Testosterone acetate propionate
 Testosterone diacetate
 Testosterone dipropionate
 Methandriol bisenanthoyl acetate
 Methandriol diacetate
 Methandriol dipropionate

References

Androgen esters
Androgens and anabolic steroids
Propionate esters
Estranes
Estrogens
Prodrugs
Progestogens
World Anti-Doping Agency prohibited substances